The men's discus throw at the 1938 European Athletics Championships was held in Paris, France, at Stade Olympique de Colombes on 5 September 1938.

Medalists

Results

Final
5 September

Participation
According to an unofficial count, 16 athletes from 11 countries participated in the event.

 (1)
 (1)
 (2)
 (2)
 (2)
 (1)
 (2)
 (1)
 (1)
 (1)
 (2)

References

Discus throw
Discus throw at the European Athletics Championships